Art Phillips (born 1955, Erie, Pennsylvania) is a composer of film, television, and popular music. Phillips has been working in film and television for over 30 years.

Early career
Phillips's career began in the early 1970s in Los Angeles, where he was a session guitarist, composer, and orchestrator working and recording for popular artists Barry Manilow, Minnie Riperton, Demis Roussos, The Carpenters, Smokey Robinson, Dory Previn, Burl Ives, The Lettermen. He did work on television series and feature films before moving to Sydney, Australia in 1987. He was musical director, conductor, and orchestrator on live concert tours for Demis Roussos, Dory Previn, and John Rowles, and toured as guitarist for Barry Manilow for over three years. He produced recordings for Demis Roussos, Barry Manilow, Sally Kellerman, and John Rowles, achieving a Gold Record Award for his production work on the album Another Chapter for John Rowles.

Phillips's earlier composition credits include background music for The Love Boat. He wrote the R & B single "Here We Go" for Minnie Riperton and co-wrote the Motown Records release "Now That I Have You" for artist Teena Marie.

He holds a Master of Music Studies from Griffith University—Queensland Conservatorium of Music.

Recent work

A highlight of his most recent scoring credits include the television series Missing Persons Unit (series 1–5), Catalyst, The Lost Treasure of Fiji (Pirate Islands), Dead Tired (two-part series), Made In China, The Secret Lives Of Sleepwalkers, Outback House, the telemovie Reprisal, Neighbours, The Flying Vet, Guiding Light, Secrets, The Fatal Bond, Signal One—Bullet Down Under, and Sher Mountain Mystery.

Phillips has a long list of credits with writing and producing original music for production music companies out of the U.S and U.K. Over the past 12 years he has released 51 CD albums in various styles. His music is used in television shows, including America's Most Wanted, NYPD Blue, The Oprah Winfrey Show, Survivor, 60 Minutes, Queer Eye for the Straight Guy, Access Hollywood, Bonehead Detectives, American Idol, The Ricki Lake Show, Good Morning America, Amazing Medical Stories, Cold Case Files, The Dog Whisperer, A True Hollywood Story, Harry's Practice, The Great Outdoors, Extra—The Entertainment Magazine Show, and The USA Today Show.

In 2004 U.S. recording artists Kenny Lattimore and Chanté Moore recorded his song "Here We Go" on their platinum album Things That Lovers Do.

Awards and honours

Phillips has won two Emmy Awards for Outstanding Music Direction and Composition in a Drama Series for the U.S. television drama Santa Barbara. In 1995, Phillips was awarded the APRA Award by the Australian Guild of Screen Composers for Best Soundtrack Album for his score to the ABC television series The Flying Vet. In 2005 he was nominated for an ARIA Award for Best Original Soundtrack Album for Outback House and was nominated in the APRA/AGSC Screen Music Awards for Best Music in a Television Series or Serial for Outback House the series. He received nominations for Best Original Music in a Children's Television Series for The Lost Treasure Of Fiji in 2007 and 2008 at the APRA/AGSC Screen Music Awards. In 2006 Phillips's composition "Floating", from U.S. recording artist Megan Rochell, achieved Billboard's Top 40 R & B chart position.

Phillips served as vice president of the Australian Guild of Screen Composers from 1992 until 2000 and as president  from 2001 to 2008. He is now a special projects consultant for the Guild. He has written on numerous subjects and delivered lectures in Screen Music Composition for universities. He is a councillor for the Music Council of Australia, representing the film and television sector.

ARIA Music Awards
The ARIA Music Awards is an annual awards ceremony that recognises excellence, innovation, and achievement across all genres of Australian music. They commenced in 1987. 

! 
|-
| 2005
| Outback House
| Best Original Cast or Show Album
| 
| 
|-

References

 Australian Music Centre
 Santa Barbara (TV series)
 Queensland Conservatorium of Music
 Music Council of Australia

External links
 Website
 APRA-AMCOS

American male composers
21st-century American composers
1955 births
Living people
21st-century American male musicians